Events from the year 1963 in France.

Incumbents
President: Charles de Gaulle 
Prime Minister: Georges Pompidou

Events
22 January – Élysée Treaty signed by Charles de Gaulle and Konrad Adenauer.
29 January – President Charles de Gaulle vetoes the United Kingdom's entry into the EEC.
4 March – In Paris, 6 people are sentenced to death for conspiring to assassinate President Charles de Gaulle. De Gaulle pardons 5 of them but the other conspirator is executed by firing squad few days later.
15 June – Carrefour open Europe's first hypermarket, in Sainte-Geneviève-des-Bois, Essonne.

Sport
23 June – Tour de France begins.
14 July – Tour de France ends, won by Jacques Anquetil.

Births

January to March
1 January – Jean-Marc Gounon, motor racing driver
6 January – Philippe Perrin, French Air Force officer, test pilot, and astronaut
7 January – Christian Louboutin, shoe designer
23 January – Éric Mura, soccer player
9 February – Lolo Ferrari, dancer, porn star, actress, and singer (died 2000)
24 February – Laurent Ruquier, journalist and television and radio host
19 March – Manu Bertin, one of the pioneers of Kite surfing
21 March – Thierry Froger, soccer manager, former player

April to June
6 April – Pauline Lafont, actress (died 1988)
7 April – Bernard Lama, soccer player
23 April – Paul Belmondo, motor racing driver
25 April – Pascal of Bollywood, singer
28 April – Sandrine Dumas, actress
8 May – Michel Gondry, Academy Award-winning screenwriter, film, commercial and music video director
10 May – Patrice Kuchna, tennis player
20 May – Gérald J. Caussé, a general authority of the Church of Jesus Christ of Latter-day Saints
24 May – Ludovic Batelli, soccer player and manager
28 May – Marc Antoine, jazz fusion guitarist
30 May – Élise Lucet, investigative journalist and television host
4 June – Nicolas Boukhrief, screenwriter, film director and actor
7 June – Roberto Alagna, operatic tenor
8 June – Agnes Clancier, novelist
12 June – Philippe Bugalski, rally driver (died 2012)
13 June – Nathalie Lupino, judoka and Olympic medallist
17 June – Christophe Barratier, film producer, film director and screenwriter
18 June – Christian Vadim, actor
25 June – Thierry Marie, cyclist

July to September
4 July – Henri Leconte, tennis player
7 July – Pascal Payet, criminal
10 July – Ronan Pensec, cyclist
12 July – Thierry Tulasne, tennis player
30 July – Benjamin de Rothschild, banker (died 2021 in Switzerland)
13 August – Édouard Michelin, businessman (died 2006)
14 August – Christophe Arleston, scenarist and editor
14 August – Emmanuelle Béart, actress
23 August – Marie-Christine Cazier, athlete
31 August – Sylvain Kastendeuch, soccer player
7 September – Éric Di Meco, politician, former soccer player
8 September – Éric Poulat, soccer referee and computer scientist

October to December
28 October – Christian Plaziat, decathlete
1 November – Philippe Lucas, soccer player
5 November – Jean-Pierre Papin, soccer manager, former player
10 November –
Sophie Amiach, tennis player
Sylvain Chomet, animator and film director
15 November – François Lemasson, soccer player
November – Pascal Parisot, songwriter and singer
2 December – Éric Boyer, cyclist
13 December – Philippe Collet, pole vaulter
18 December – Pauline Ester, singer
22 December – Christophe Lavainne, cyclist
30 December – Xavier Mauméjean, writer

Full date unknown
Gilles Bourdos, film director, screenwriter and producer
Stéphane Derenoncourt, oenologist
Sophie Lacaze, composer
Jean-Yves Malmasson, composer and conductor
Pierre Maubouché, actor, voice over artist, producer and casting director
Xavier Veilhan, artist

Deaths

January to March
23 January – Gustave Garrigou, cyclist and 1911 Tour de France winner (born 1884)
30 January – Francis Poulenc, composer (born 1899)
9 February – Marcel Godivier, cyclist (born 1887)
10 February – Louis Paulhan, pilot (born 1883)
4 March – Édouard Belin, photographic inventor (born 1876)
10 March – André Maschinot, soccer player (born 1903)
11 March – Jean Bastien-Thiry, attempted assassin of President Charles de Gaulle in 1962 (born 1927)
26 March – Pierre Lacau, Egyptologist and philologist (born 1873)
29 March – Henry Bordeaux, writer and lawyer (born 1870)

April to June
10 May – Léonce Crenier, Roman Catholic monk and theologian (born 1888)
1 June – Yves le Prieur, naval officer and inventor (born 1885)
3 June – Edmond Decottignies, weightlifter and Olympic gold medallist (born 1893)
8 June – Gaston Ramon, veterinarian and biologist (born 1886)
9 June – Jacques Villon, painter and printmaker (born 1875)

July to September
1 July – Camille Chautemps, politician and three times Prime Minister of France (born 1885)
7 July – Géo-Charles, poet (born 1892)
31 August – Georges Braque, painter and sculptor (born 1882)
6 September – Jules Isaac, historian (born 1877)
11 September – Suzanne Duchamp, painter (born 1889)
22 September – Bernadette Cattanéo, trade unionist, communist activist, newspaper editor (born 1899)

October to December
10 October – Édith Piaf, singer (born 1915)
11 October – Jean Cocteau, poet, novelist, dramatist, designer and filmmaker (born 1889)
17 October – Jacques Hadamard, mathematician (born 1865)
21 October – Jean Decoux, Governor-General of French Indochina (born 1884)
25 October – Roger Désormière, conductor (born 1898)
11 November – André Le Troquer, politician and lawyer (born 1884)

Full date unknown
René Baudichon, sculptor and medallist (born 1878)
René Guyon, jurist (born 1876)

See also
 List of French films of 1963

References

1960s in France